Blindman (also known in Italian as Il Pistolero Cieco, lit. "The Blind Gunfighter") is a 1971 Spaghetti Western film directed by Ferdinando Baldi and co-written and co-produced by Tony Anthony. The film's protagonist, played by Anthony, is an homage to Kan Shimozawa's Zatoichi character: a blind transient who does odd jobs and is actually a high-skilled warrior.

The film has achieved cult status over the years, mainly due to the involvement of Ringo Starr, a former member of the Beatles, in one of the roles.

Plot
A blind but deadly gunman is hired to escort fifty mail order brides to their miner husbands. When he is double crossed by his friends and a Mexican bandit, he heads for Mexico to settle scores and save the women.

Cast

 Tony Anthony as Blindman/Ciego
 Ringo Starr as Candy
 Lloyd Battista as Domingo
 Magda Konopka as Sweet Mama
 Raf Baldassarre as El General
 Agneta Eckemyr as Pilar
 David Dreyer as Dude
 Marisa Solinas as Margherita
 Gaetano Scala as Domingo Henchman
 Franz von Treuberg as Pilar's Father
 Carla Brait as Maid
 John Frederick as Sheriff
 Guido Mannari as Mexican Officer
 Fortunato Arena as Mexican Officer
 Salvatore Billa as Domingo Henchman
 Renato Romano as Skunk (uncredited)
 Tito García as Train Engineer (uncredited)
 Allen Klein as Fat Rifleman (uncredited)
 Mal Evans as Bearded Rifleman (uncredited)

Brides

 Mary Badin
 Dominque Badou
 Shirley Corrigan
 Giuliana Giuliani
 Katerina Lindfelt
 Malisa Longo
 Alice Mannell
 Krista Nell
 Helen Parker
 Elena Pedemonte
 Janine Reynaud
 Karin Skarreso
 Solvi Stubing
 Melù Valente

References

External links

1971 films
Spaghetti Western films
1970s Italian-language films
English-language Italian films
1970s English-language films
Films directed by Ferdinando Baldi
Films scored by Stelvio Cipriani
1971 Western (genre) films
Mexican Revolution films
Films shot in Almería
Films about blind people
1970s exploitation films
1971 multilingual films
Italian multilingual films
1970s Italian films